St. John Colleges, formerly ST. John Academy, is a private nonsectarian school that provides education from preparatory to college level in Calamba, Philippines. It was founded in 1951. It is located in Chipeco Avenue, Barangay 3, Calamba. Previously, it was located near the St. John Baptist Parish Church in the main town of Calamba.

The President of the school administration is Ma. Cynthia A. Meneses. The principal is the former physics instructor, Mrs. Portia Egken. The school holds many programs for the students like Buwan ng Wika, cultural contests, street dances, and so much more. The excellence of this institution when it comes to academic and extra co-curricular activities only makes it one of the best schools in the city of Calamba.

History
This school started as an academy in 1951 which only accepted secondary level students. 
And now Saint John Colleges is accepting college, elementary, kindergarten, and high school enrollees.

Universities and colleges in Laguna (province)
Education in Calamba, Laguna